Horana is a town in Kalutara District, in the Western Province of Sri Lanka.

The town is administered by an Urban Council. Horana is the home town of former Prime Minister of Sri Lanka Ratnasiri Wickremanayake.

Etymology  
The name, Horana, refers to the Hora tree, which there were significant numbers in this area in the past.

Education 
There are number of schools in Horana including Taxila Central College, Sri Palee College, Royal College of Horana, Don Pedric M.V, Medankara M.V, Taxila M.V, Vidyarathana University College, Prajapathi Balika Vidylaya and Ealla Kanda Thamil Maha Vidyalayam, Ashoka college, and Sussex College.

The Sri Palee campus (formerly known as the Western campus) of the University of Colombo is also located in the town. The campus was established by the Sri Lankan Government on 20 June 1996 and its name was subsequently amended to Sri Palee Campus on 11 September 1998. It is built on land donated to the university in 1976 by the board of the Sri Palee Trust set up by Wilmot A. Perera, a politician and philanthropist. It has two faculties: the Faculty of Performing Arts and the Faculty of Mass Media.

References 

 
Populated places in Western Province, Sri Lanka